The 1836 United States presidential election in Rhode Island took place between November 3 and December 7, 1836, as part of the 1836 United States presidential election. Voters chose four representatives, or electors to the Electoral College, who voted for President and Vice President.

Rhode Island voted for Democratic candidate Martin Van Buren over Whig candidate William Henry Harrison. Van Buren won Rhode Island by a narrow margin of 4.48%.

This was the first time that Rhode Island ever voted for a Democratic presidential candidate, and Van Buren's performance would not be bettered by a Democrat in Rhode Island until Franklin D. Roosevelt in 1932.

Results

See also
 United States presidential elections in Rhode Island

References

Rhode Island
1836
1836 Rhode Island elections